Pedro Alexandre Marques Caldas Xavier (born 26 January 1962) is a Portuguese retired footballer who played as a forward.

Club career
Xavier was born in Lourenço Marques, Portuguese Mozambique. An unsuccessful Sporting CP youth graduate, he went on to represent in his country G.D. Estoril Praia, Académica de Coimbra, C.F. Estrela da Amadora, S.C. Campomaiorense, F.C. Barreirense and C.D. Olivais e Moscavide. He spent ten seasons in the Primeira Liga, amassing totals of 224 matches and 48 goals.

Aged 33, Xavier moved abroad, playing three years in Hong Kong for South China AA before retiring from professional football.

International career
After the 1986 FIFA World Cup – almost the entire squad renounced the national team due to the Saltillo Affair – Xavier won the better part of his four caps for Portugal.

Personal life
Xavier's twin brother, Carlos, was also a professional footballer. A midfielder, he played several seasons with Sporting's first team.

References

External links

1962 births
Living people
Portuguese twins
Twin sportspeople
Sportspeople from Maputo
Portuguese footballers
Association football forwards
Primeira Liga players
Liga Portugal 2 players
Segunda Divisão players
G.D. Estoril Praia players
Associação Académica de Coimbra – O.A.F. players
C.F. Estrela da Amadora players
S.C. Campomaiorense players
F.C. Barreirense players
C.D. Olivais e Moscavide players
Hong Kong First Division League players
South China AA players
Portugal under-21 international footballers
Portugal international footballers
Portuguese expatriate footballers
Expatriate footballers in Hong Kong
Portuguese expatriate sportspeople in Hong Kong